HuC6270 is a video display controller (VDC) developed by Hudson Soft and manufactured for Hudson Soft by Seiko Epson. The VDC was used in the PC Engine game console produced by NEC Corporation, and the upgraded PC Engine SuperGrafx.

Besides use in consoles, the VDC was used in two arcade games. The arcade version of Bloody Wolf ran on a custom version of the PC Engine. The arcade hardware is missing the second 16-bit graphic chip known as the video color encoder that is in the PC Engine. This means the VDC directly accesses palette RAM and builds out the display signals/timing. A rare Capcom quiz-type arcade game also ran on a modified version of the SuperGrafx hardware, which used two VDCs.

References

Graphics chips
TurboGrafx-16